Solomonville School District 5  is a school district in Graham County, Arizona

References

External links
 

School districts in Graham County, Arizona